Tour de Force is the thirteenth studio album by saxophonist Nick Brignola. The album was released 18 days after his death on February 26, 2002.

Track list 
All compositions by Nick Brignola

 Backwoods Song – 7:38
 Local Motion – 8:09
 Donna Lee – 5:02
 In Your Own Street Way – 7:52
 Centerpiece – 7:41
 "Labyrinth" – 6:38
 "V.I." – 6:45
 "I Should Care" – 4:27
 "Indigo Rays" – 4:5

Personnel 

 Nick Brignola – baritone saxophone
 Chuck D'Aloia – guitar
 Eddie Gómez – bass
 Bill Stewart – drums
 Café – percussion (tracks 1, 4 & 9)

References 

Nick Brignola albums
2002 albums
Reservoir Records albums